Ninggerum is one of the Ok languages of Papua New Guinea and West Papua.

It is one of several related languages called Muyu.

Phonology

Consonants

References

Further reading
 

Languages of Sandaun Province
Languages of western New Guinea
Ok languages